Ferdinand Keller, or von Keller (5 August 1842 – 8 July 1922) was a German genre and history painter.

Life 
He was born in Karlsruhe to the family of a civil engineer. In 1857, when he was fifteen, his father was awarded a contract to design bridges, roads and dams in Brazil. Ferdinand and his brother Franz were able to accompany him. Over the course of a four-year stay, he was able to teach himself drawing by sketching the tropical landscape. Shortly after their return, he enrolled at the Academy of Fine Arts, Karlsruhe, where he studied with Johann Wilhelm Schirmer, the former Director of the Academy. After Schirmer's death, he studied with Ludwig des Coudres.

He was unsatisfied with the Academy, however, and took private lessons in the studio of Hans Canon. This was followed, in 1866 and 1867, by study trips to Switzerland and France. He achieved his first recognition with his painting "The Death of Philip II" at the International Exposition. From 1867 to 1869, he lived in Rome, where he made the acquaintance of Anselm Feuerbach and maintained a joint studio with him.

In 1870, he became a teacher of portrait and history painting at the Karlsruhe Academy and was appointed a Professor in 1873. From 1880 to 1913, he served as director.

In addition to his regular paintings, he provided decorations and curtains for the new Karlsruhe Court Theater and the Dresden Semperoper. His decorations for the King Carl Hall at the Landesmuseum Württemberg pleased the King so much that he awarded Keller a title of nobility. On a smaller scale, his etchings have been used to illustrate numerous books.

He died in 1922 in Baden-Baden. A street in Karlsruhe was named after him in 1964.

Selected paintings

References

Further reading 
 Michael Koch: Ferdinand Keller, Karlsruhe, C.F. Müller, 1978  
 Leo Mülfarth: Kleines Lexikon Karlsruher Maler. Karlsruhe 1987, pgs.70-72, S. 70-72
 Eva-Maria Froitzheim: Ferdinand Keller (1842-1992). Gemälde. Zeichnungen (Guidebook for the Staatlichen Kunsthalle Karlsruhe Nr. 15), Karlsruhe 1992,

External links 

 

1842 births
1922 deaths
19th-century German painters
19th-century German male artists
German male painters
20th-century German painters
20th-century German male artists
Academic staff of the Academy of Fine Arts, Karlsruhe